USS Regis II (SP-1083) was a United States Navy patrol vessel in commission from 1917 to 1919.

Regis II was built as a private motor yacht or motorboat of the same name in 1902 for J. E. Kerr of Baltimore, Maryland, by Simon Martin. In 1917, her owner loaned her to the U.S. Navy for use as a section patrol boat during World War I. The Navy took delivery of her in the 5th Naval District on 16 July 1917, and she was commissioned on 17 July 1917 as USS Regis II (SP-1083).

Assigned to the 5th Naval District, Regis II served on patrol duty in the harbor at Norfolk, Virginia, in Hampton Roads, and in the lower Chesapeake Bay through the end of World War I.

The Navy returned Regis II to her owner on 25 January 1919.

References

Department of the Navy Naval History and Heritage Command Online Library of Selected Images: Civilian Ships: Regis II (American Motor Boat, 1902). Served as USS Regis II (SP-1083) in 1917-1919
NavSource Online: Section Patrol Craft Photo Archive Regis II (SP 1083)

Patrol vessels of the United States Navy
World War I patrol vessels of the United States
1902 ships
Individual yachts